Music to Strip By is an album by the Maryland rock group Half Japanese. It was the first album released on their label, 50 Skidillion Watts.

Critical reception
The Quietus wrote that "Music To Strip By [is] a rag bag of musical influences tied to tall tales with a verisimilitude to Jad's own beguiling, charmed life." The Spin Alternative Record Guide singled out the cover of Fats Domino's "Blue Monday" for praise.

Track listing

References 

1987 albums
Half Japanese albums
50 Skidillion Watts albums